State Highway 68 (SH 68) is a proposed state highway traveling from I-69C/US 281 in Edinburg to I-2/US 83 in Donna.

Route description

History

The route was originally designated on August 21, 1923 to replace SH 10A between Stephenville and Dallas. In 1932, the portion from Stephenville to Dallas was cosigned with US 67. Another section was designated on March 22, 1938 from Eastland to Lingleville. On October 25, 1938, it extended to Stephenville. On January 23, 1939, SH 68 was rerouted west to Gorman. On September 26, 1939, the section from Stephenville to Dallas was cosigned with US 67, so the SH 68 designation was dropped from this section. On March 26, 1942, the remaining route was deleted in favor of the newly formed Farm to Market Road system, with part being redesignated FM 8. The current route was designated on February 28, 2013.

See also

References

068
Transportation in Hidalgo County, Texas